Johnny Gioeli (born October 5, 1967) is an American singer, songwriter and composer, known as the vocalist of the hard rock band Crush 40. He is also the original lead singer of the band Hardline and a member of German guitarist Axel Rudi Pell's band. He is most well known in pop culture for his contributions to the Sonic the Hedgehog games during the 2000s.

Biography 
Gioeli's musical career began in the early 1980s after forming the band Phaze with his older brother, Joey. The band underwent reform and he started drumming with the band Killerhit in 1983 at the age of 16. Sharing vocal duties with Joey. The four-piece act hit the East Coast club circuit with an enormous amount of success, earning enough by 1987 to purchase their own lighting rig, truck and tour bus (purchased from Jimmy Buffett's guitar player in Memphis).

Re-locating to Hollywood, Killerhit hooked up with bandmate and guitarist Christopher Paul's friend Poison's Bret Michaels. The singer gave them his former publicist Debra Rosner's number who instantly became the band's manager. Realizing the need for a front man, Gioeli vacated the drum stool for center stage, Las Vegas native Darek Thomas Cava taking his place behind the drum kit. Soon after, the band realized there was not a single blonde among them, and changed their name to the more appropriate Brunette. The band broke The Doors and Van Halen's single-weekend attendance records on the Sunset Strip in Hollywood, California. Their sensation soon brought attention and admiration to the recording industry. They were courted by top record executives for months. The band had built a loyal worldwide fan base. Differences began to develop in the Brunette camp before a recording deal could be secured, and the band decided to call it quits in 1991. Gioeli then started working with his brother Joey on songs for an album they were going to call Brothers. However, Neal Schon, Journey's guitarist (who was dating their sister at the time) met with them and asked if he could play with them, and they agreed. Then, in 1992, they released their first effort, entitled Double Eclipse, and called themselves Hardline, which was moderately successful but not enough to get into the mainstream, especially considering its post-Nirvana release. After this they began writing songs for a second album but once again called it quits while recording the songs due to troubles with their manager and Neal Schon. Gioeli had all but disappeared from the music scene until, in 1998, German guitarist Axel Rudi Pell found himself in need of a vocalist after the departure of Jeff Scott Soto.  Pell had admired Gioeli for a long time, stating he always thought Gioeli's vocals would go well with his music. Pell eventually found means of contacting Gioeli and flew him to Germany to record vocals for his Oceans of Time CD, which up to date has been considered as one of the best Pell albums. He is now the permanent lead vocalist of the band and shows no signs of leaving.

He also participated in Michael Voss's compilation album titled Voices Of Rock - MMVII, released on July 20, 2007, on which he performed the song "Phoenix Rising". In 1994, Gioeli also collaborated with musician Doug Aldrich, who had performed live as a guest guitarist for Brunette, and performed the vocals for the song "Face Down" featured on Aldrich's Highcentered album, later included again on Aldrich's 2002 album Alter Ego. Gioeli released his first solo album, entitled One Voice, which was released through PledgeMusic on December 7, 2018.

Hardline's returning album 

After considerable success of their debut CD, Double Eclipse, the band was dissolved for ten years during which Gioeli and his brother followed a career in internet business. After he met with further success in Axel Rudi Pell's band, Gioeli and his band Hardline returned with a new lineup to release their second album entitled II, released in 2002, followed by the live CD/DVD in 2003, named Live at the Gods Festival 2002. Their third album, Leaving the End Open, was released April 17, 2009. On December 22, 2011, Gioeli confirmed, via Frontiers Records official site, that he and Italian producer and keyboard player Alessandro Del Vecchio would release Hardline's fourth studio album Danger Zone on May 18, 2012, yet again with a new lineup. On October 14, 2016, Hardline's fifth studio album, Human Nature, was released. In 2019, Gioeli officially announced Hardline's sixth album, Life, which will be released in April. This will be the first Hardline album featuring a cover song since the debut album's track "Hot Cherie". This time, the cover is Queen's "Who Wants to Live Forever", a personal favorite of Gioeli's.

Crush 40 

In addition to being a vocalist for two bands, he has also been working with video game composer and musician Jun Senoue and has delivered his vocals in the Sons of Angels CD; Thrill of the Feel, released in 2000. The band has since changed their name to Crush 40. They have written and performed several songs from the Sonic the Hedgehog series produced by Sega and Sonic Team, such as the theme tune "Sonic Heroes" from the game of the same name, a bright, melodic song and in contrast to "What I'm Made Of...", a distinctly dark, energetic hard rock song for the final battle against Metal Sonic Overlord. He was also the vocalist for the songs "Open Your Heart", the main theme of Sonic Adventure, "Live and Learn", the main theme of Sonic Adventure 2, "I Am... All of Me", the main theme of Shadow the Hedgehog, the ending theme "Never Turn Back", a cover of the band Magna-Fi's "All Hail Shadow", for the ending theme of Shadow's story in Sonic the Hedgehog 2006, and "Knight of the Wind", the main theme of Sonic and the Black Knight as well as the ending theme "Live Life". Additionally, Gioeli has worked with Senoue to produce a cover of Steve Conte's "Seven Rings in Hand", which was featured exclusively on the Japan-only release True Blue: The Best of Sonic the Hedgehog. He also wrote the chorus for the Sonic the Hedgehog theme song "His World" and recorded a version of the song with Crush 40 (featured as a bonus track on the game's official soundtrack).

Gioeli provided his vocals on the soundtrack to the game Sonic and the Black Knight on the tracks "Fight the Knight" and "Through the Fire". In October 2008, Gioeli and Senoue took the stage at the Tokyo Game Show to perform some of their most popular Sonic-based songs in front of a live audience for the first time. Gioeli and Senoue have since created a YouTube account and uploaded video footage of the event.

In 2009, a new Crush 40 album was released entitled The Best of Crush 40 – Super Sonic Songs. This compilation album contains most of the band's Sonic the Hedgehog releases as well as a mixture of old tracks from the NASCAR Arcade game and some brand new songs including a cover of "Un-Gravitify", the main theme of Sonic Riders: Zero Gravity, a cover of the Cult's "Fire Woman", and an original ballad entitled "Is It You". The album also contains remixed tracks of "Open Your Heart", "I Am...All of Me", "His World", and "Knight of the Wind".

In 2010, Gioeli performed with Senoue as Crush 40 at the 2010 Summer of Sonic convention in London on August 7, 2010. It was Crush 40's first full-length performance and their first performance outside Japan. In that same year, they recorded a cover of "Free", the main theme of Sonic Free Riders, as a bonus track in the game's official soundtrack. In 2011, the band performed at Sonic Boom to celebrate Sonic's 20th anniversary. In addition to this, they also performed in Tokyo at Guilty stage, of which many concert videos were produced
In 2012, the band performed at two conventions. The first one is at the Summer of Sonic in Brighton and at the Sonic Boom in San Diego during the Comic Con. The band has released their first live album on October 3, 2012, entitled Live!, which featured songs from their concerts in Tokyo back in March. In 2013, the band performed in St. Louis for the Sonic Boom 2013 event. In 2015, the band released 2 Nights 2 Remember featuring four brand new songs and thirteen songs from their 2N2R live tour in 2014. They appeared in 2016 at the House of Blues in San Diego to play several tracks for the 25th anniversary of the Sonic series. In 2017 and 2018, Gioeli performed solo at TooManyGames.

In 2018, Sega announced a new Sonic racing game titled Team Sonic Racing which features a new Crush 40 song called "Green Light Ride", which serves as the game's main theme. The game was released on May 21, 2019. In a recent interview, Gioeli has stated that a second Crush 40 "Best of" album is currently in the works and will be known as Driving Through Forever: The Ultimate Crush 40 Collection, which was released on July 24, 2019. The album contains a brand new song called "Call Me Crazy". To honor 30 years of the Sonic franchise, a special Sonic Symphony concert took place on June 23, 2021, with Crush 40 as one of the special guests, performing their latest hits from the series. Gioeli provided his vocals for the song "Crushing Thirties" by The Chalkeaters, a three man music group out of Saint Petersburg, Russia. The song is also themed to Sonic's 30th anniversary, however, in a much more realistic scenario.

Discography

Guest / feature performances 
 High Centered with Doug Aldrich (2002)
 She's On Fire (2006)
 Voice of Rock (2007)
 Herman Rarebell (2014)
 Set the World on Fire (2018)
 Robert Rodrigo Band (2018)
 Restless Spirits (2019)
 Jeff Scot Soto and Friends (2021)
 Circus of Rock (2021)
 Crushing Thirties (2022)
 Jitsu Squad (2022)

Axel Rudi Pell 
 Oceans of Time (1998)
 The Ballads II (1999)
 The Masquerade Ball (2000)
 The Wizard's Chosen Few (Compilation) (2000)
 Shadow Zone (2002)
 Knights Live (Live CD) (2002)
 Knight Treasures (Live and More) DVD (2002)
 Kings And Queens (2004)
 The Ballads III (2004)
 Mystica (2006)
 Diamonds Unlocked (2007)
 Live Over Europe 2008 DVD (2008)
 Tales of the Crown (2008)
 The Best of Axel Rudi Pell: Anniversary Edition (2009)
 One Night Live DVD (2010)
 The Crest (2010)
 The Ballads IV (2011)
 Circle of the Oath (2012)
 Live on Fire (Live CD/Live DVD) (2013)
 Into the Storm (2014)
 Magic Moments (Live CD/Live DVD) (2015)
 Game of Sins (2016)
 The Ballads V (2017)
 Knights Call (2018)
 Sign of the Times (2020)
 Lost XXIII(2022)

Hardline 
 Double Eclipse (1992)
 II (2002)
 Live at the Gods Festival 2002 (Live CD/DVD) (2003)
 Leaving the End Open (2009)
 Danger Zone (2012)
 Human Nature (2016)
 Life (2019)
 Life Live (2020)
 Heart, Mind and Soul (2021)

Crush 40 
 Sonic Team «PowerPlay» — Best Songs from Sonic Team (1998)
 Sonic Adventure: Songs With Attitude Vocal Mini-Album (1998)
 Sonic Adventure REMIX (1998)
 Sonic Adventure Original Soundtrack (1999)
 Thrill of the Feel (as Sons of Angels) - (2000)
 Sonic Adventure 2 Multi-Dimensional Original Soundtrack (2001)
 Sonic Adventure 2 Vocal Collections: Cuts Unleashed (2001)
 Sonic Adventure 2 Official Soundtrack (2002)
 Rock on Bones (2003)
 Crush 40 (European release of Thrill of the Feel) - (2003)
 Sonic Heroes Original Soundtrax (2003)
 Triple Threat: Sonic Heroes Vocal Trax (2003)
 Shadow the Hedgehog Original Soundtrack (2005)
 Lost and Found: Shadow the Hedgehog Vocal Trax (2005)
 Sonic the Hedgehog Original Sound Track (2007)
 Sonic the Hedgehog Vocal Traxx: Several Wills (2007)
 Super Smash Bros. Brawl (2008)
 True Blue: The Best of Sonic the Hedgehog (2008)
 Face to Faith: Sonic and the Black Knight Vocal Trax (2009)
 True Colors: The Best of Sonic the Hedgehog Part 2 (2009)
 The Best of Crush 40 – Super Sonic Songs (2009)
 Tales of Knighthood: Sonic and the Black Knight Original Soundtrax (2009)
 Face to Faith: Sonic and the Black Knight Vocal Trax (2009)
 Mario & Sonic at the Olympic Winter Games (2009)
 Sonic Free Riders Original Soundtrack: Break Free (2010)
 Sonic Adventure Original Soundtrack - 20th Anniversary Edition (2011)
 Sonic Adventure 2 Original Soundtrack - 20th Anniversary Edition (2011)
 Sonic Heroes Original Soundtrack - 20th Anniversary Edition (2011)
 Sonic the Hedgehog CD Original Soundtrack - 20th Anniversary Edition (2011)
 History of Sonic Music 20th Anniversary Edition (2011)
 Sonic Generations Original Soundtrack: Blue Blur (2011)
 Mario & Sonic at the London 2012 Olympic Games (2011)
 Rise Again (2012)
 Live! (2012)
 Mario & Sonic at the Sochi 2014 Olympic Winter Games (2013)
 Super Smash Bros. for Nintendo 3DS and Wii U (2014)
 2 Nights 2 Remember (2015)
 Mario & Sonic at the Rio 2016 Olympic Games (2016)
 Super Smash Bros. Ultimate (2018)
 Team Sonic Racing Original Soundtrack - Maximum Overdrive (2019)
 Driving Through Forever: The Ultimate Crush 40 Collection (2019)
 Mario & Sonic at the Olympic Games Tokyo 2020 (2019)

Solo 
 One Voice (2018)

References

External links 

 Axel Rudi Pell - Official homepage
 Hardline - Official homepage
 Jun Senoue - Official homepage
 Brunette - Tribute

Living people
American heavy metal singers
American rock singers
American tenors
American people of Italian descent
Crush 40 members
Hardline (band) members
Musicians from Brooklyn
Singers from New York City
1967 births